Century Commercial Bank Limited was a commercial bank in Nepal. The bank was an ‘A’ class commercial bank licensed by Nepal Rastra Bank and has branches all across the nation with its head office in Kathmandu which provides entire commercial banking services. But now it's merged with Prabhu bank Limited in January 2023.

The bank's shares are publicly traded as an 'A' category company in the Nepal Stock Exchange.

Before merging with Prabhu Bank Limited, the Bank has a network of 132 branches, 10 extension counters, 22 branchless banking and 92 ATMs across the country and offers a wide range of banking products in deposits, lending and other value added services such as internet/ mobile banking, remittance and branchless banking etc. The Bank’s team consists of more than 950 staffs and caters to more than 500,000 customers.

Correspondent Network
Century bank is merged with Prabhu bank Limited in January 2023 and perform all the transactions with the name of Prabhu Bank Limited. The bank has been maintaining harmonious correspondent relationships with various international banks from various countries to facilitate trade, remittance and other cross border services. Through these correspondents the bank is able to provide services in any major currencies in the world.

Network

External links
 Official Website of Century Bank Limited
 Official Website of Nepal Rastra Bank

See also

 list of banks in Nepal
 Commercial Banks of Nepal

References

Banks of Nepal
Banks with year of establishment missing